Synodontis koensis is a species of upside-down catfish endemic to Ivory Coast where it occurs in the Nzo River basin.  This species grows to a length of  TL.  This species can be found in the aquarium trade.

References

External links

koensis
Catfish of Africa
Freshwater fish of West Africa
Endemic fauna of Ivory Coast
Taxa named by Jacques Pellegrin
Fish described in 1933